Polyvalente Louis-Mailloux is a Francophone high school in Caraquet, New Brunswick, Canada.

External links
 PLM School Site

High schools in New Brunswick
Education in Kent County, New Brunswick
Caraquet